Rajat kumar is an Indian businessman. He is the founder of IMEX INDIA E-COMMERCE, B2B Products.

Education 
Rajat completed his bachelor's degree in b.com from the krukshetra university krukshetra in 2018.

Career 
Rajat founded B2B Imex india in 2020. The group companies focus on Retail and logistics services.

Awards and recognition 
 2008: Recognized as e-learning thought leader by TrainingIndustry.com  
 2009: Featured in the TV program "Swades" on Zee Business, which features entrepreneurs who returned to India and set up successful enterprises
 2012: Conferred with the Distinguished Service Award by IIT Bombay
 2013: Recognized in top ten World e-learning movers and shakers in 2013  
 2017: American Educational Research Association recognized his research  in entrepreneurship with 'Dissertation of the Year 2017' award

References

External links 
 
 Harbinger Group

Year of birth missing (living people)
Living people
Businesspeople from Pune
IIT Bombay alumni
Syracuse University alumni